The 2002–03 Eastern European Hockey League season, was the eighth season of the Eastern European Hockey League, a multi-national ice hockey league. 16 teams participated in the league, 10 in Division 1, and six in Division 2. HK Keramin Minsk of Belarus won Division 1, and ASK Jelgava of Latvia won Division 2.

Division 1

Division 2

External links
2002-03 season on hockeyarchives.info

2
Eastern European Hockey League seasons